The following is a list of affiliates of the defunct America One television network in the United States and its territories. This list does not include the numerous regional cable sports networks that America One served.

Former affiliates

References

External links

America One